The 1992–93 season was Manchester United's first season in the newly formed FA Premier League, and their 18th consecutive season in the top division of English football.

The season was marked by the club winning the inaugural Premier League title, ending their 26-year run without an English league title. They ended up winning the title by a 10-point margin over runners-up Aston Villa, but had fought a three-horse race for much of the season with both Villa and Norwich City, not topping the table until January. The arrival of Eric Cantona from Leeds United for £1  million in late November (although Leeds announced this as £1.2million to keep the peace between with the fans) helped boost United's title challenge, after they had been as low as 10th in the league shortly before. Cantona's arrival came after new striker Dion Dublin had been ruled out for six months with a broken leg, and Cantona was the catalyst in United's triumph which was confirmed on 2 May 1993 when Aston Villa lost at home to Oldham Athletic and therefore could not catch up to United.

Mark Hughes topped the goalscoring charts with 15 league goals, while the brilliant Ryan Giggs was voted PFA Young Player of the Year for the second year in succession. Steve Bruce was United's captain for much of the season, as the veteran Bryan Robson missed many games due to injury. The arrival of Eric Cantona saw former striker Brian McClair switched into midfield, further restricting Robson's first team chances.

In the UEFA Cup, United bowed out on penalties to Torpedo Moscow of Russia, after two goalless draws. Their League Cup campaign ended in the Third Round with defeat at Aston Villa. The FA Cup bid ended in the Fifth Round when they lost 2–1 to Sheffield United in a game where Steve Bruce uncharacteristically missed a penalty.

Making their debuts this season were teenagers David Beckham, Nicky Butt and Gary Neville.

Before the season began, United were linked with a move for Southampton striker Alan Shearer, who had first been mentioned in the media as a possible transfer target during the autumn of 1991, but the player signed for Blackburn Rovers instead. Dion Dublin was then signed from Cambridge United, but was injured just one month after his arrival, and United struggled to find the net in the weeks that followed, the club was linked with the signature of numerous other strikers. A £3 million bid for Sheffield Wednesday's David Hirst was rejected, while Sheffield United striker Brian Deane was also linked with a move to Old Trafford, but no firm offer was made. The hunt for a new striker ended on 26 November, when Eric Cantona was signed from Leeds United for a fee of just over £1 million.

By the end of the season, United were being linked with a move for Nottingham Forest's 21-year-old Irish midfielder Roy Keane, who was also a target for Arsenal and Blackburn Rovers. After the player nearly signed for Blackburn, United snapped him up on 19 July 1993 for a British record fee of £3.75 million.

It was the last season at Old Trafford for midfielder Neil Webb, who returned to Nottingham Forest in November after losing his place in the Old Trafford first team. Russell Beardsmore, who did not play a game all season, joined AFC Bournemouth on a free transfer at the end of the season.

Pre-season and friendlies

FA Premier League

FA Cup

League Cup

UEFA Cup

Squad statistics

Transfers
United's first departure of the 1992–93 season was Mal Donaghy, who joined Chelsea on 13 August. The next day, Mark Robins signed for Norwich City for a fee of £800,000. Also on their way out of the club were Republic of Ireland defender Derek Brazil, Northern Irish forward Colin Telford, and English midfielder Neil Webb.

Meanwhile, arriving in the summer were American forward Jovan Kirovski, Northern Irish centre-back Pat McGibbon and English forward Dion Dublin. French forward Eric Cantona joined later on 27 November.

On 19 March, Kieran Toal left United to sign for Motherwell. Raphael Burke was released on 10 April, while Russell Beardsmore joined Bournemouth on 29 June. Adrian Doherty, George Switzer, and Ian Wilkinson left the club a day after Beardsmore's departure.

United's only winter arrival was Les Sealey, who signed from Aston Villa on 6 January.

In

Out

Loan in

Loan out

Events of the season

After a shortage of goals in the second half of the previous season had cost United the league title, Alex Ferguson began the hunt to sign a new striker. A name which had been strongly linked with United for months was Alan Shearer, the 21-year-old Southampton and England striker. United's hopes of signing Shearer were given a boost on 7 July when Southampton manager Ian Branfoot announced that Shearer could leave the Hampshire club if the price was right.

While the hunt was on for one striker to join United, another was on his way out of the club. Striker Mark Robins, who had rarely played in 1991–92, was on the transfer list and finally signed for Norwich City, whose new manager Mike Walker paid £800,000 as he looked to build an attack capable of scoring the goals to keep the Canaries in the new FA Premier League. Few people could have imagined then that Robins and his new team would emerge as title contenders in the first season of the new Premier League.

The race to sign Alan Shearer was lost on 23 July, when the player opted for a national record £3.6 million move to newly promoted Blackburn Rovers, managed by Kenny Dalglish and bankrolled by steel baron Jack Walker, who were looking set to re-establish themselves as a top club in their first top flight campaign since the 1960s.

United did express interest in signing Tottenham Hotspur's Paul Stewart, a versatile player capable of playing in attack and midfield, but the player signed for Liverpool instead – in what would ultimately prove to be a disastrous transfer.

The hunt to find a new striker ended on 7 August, eight days before the start of the new season, when Dion Dublin signed from Cambridge United for £1 million as United's only close season signing. Dublin, 23, had been one of the most competent goalscorers outside the top flight during the last three seasons as Cambridge soared from the Fourth Division to the brink of the Premier League, though it was clear that he would start off his time at Old Trafford as an understudy to Mark Hughes and Brian McClair.

United's first game in the new Premier League was against Sheffield United at Bramall Lane, and was a major disappointment as they lost 2–1 and the South Yorkshire club's striker Brian Deane earned the distinction of scoring the very first goal of the new league.

Two days later, 21-year-old winger Lee Sharpe was diagnosed with viral meningitis and was ruled out for over three months, leaving United with a major crisis in midfield and on the flanks.

The first Premier League game at Old Trafford was on 19 August, against Everton, but was a huge disappointment as United lost 3–0 in their second worst home defeat since Alex Ferguson took over as manager in November 1986.

The first point came at the third attempt on 22 August, but United only managed a 1–1 draw at home to newly promoted Ipswich Town, casting serious doubt among fans and the media as to whether United were capable of ending their long wait for the title this season.

United's first Premier League win came at the fourth attempt on 24 August, when Dion Dublin scored his first United goal in a 1–0 win at Southampton. The next four games were all won as United climbed to third place by mid September, with Norwich City top of the table and Blackburn Rovers second. One of those games – a 1–0 win at home to Crystal Palace – saw Dublin suffer a broken leg that ruled him out for six months. A five-match run of league draws followed, and during that run of draws came a first hurdle exit from the UEFA Cup at the hands of Russian side Torpedo Moscow, when they lost on penalties after two goalless draws. The first leg at Old Trafford saw the debut of 17-year-old defender Gary Neville.

Later that month, United began their defence of the League Cup with a 1–1 draw at Brighton & Hove Albion in the second round first leg, in which another player – 17-year-old David Beckham – made his debut. United won the return leg 1–0 at Old Trafford but their hopes of retaining the trophy ended on 28 October when they suffered a 1–0 exit to Aston Villa in the third round at Villa Park. Villa, managed by former United boss Ron Atkinson (who had guided his old club Sheffield Wednesday to a shock 1–0 win over United in the League Cup final 18 months earlier), were also emerging as title contenders. Surprise challenges were also emerging from the likes of Coventry City and QPR.

United's run of draws ended on 31 October – in defeat, as they were beaten 1–0 at home by a Wimbledon side who had beaten United and several other clubs on a number of occasions since their promotion in 1986. The scorer that day was Lawrie Sanchez, the midfielder whose goal at Wembley in May 1988 had seen Wimbledon defeat Liverpool in the FA Cup final. A week later, United's winless run extended to seven matches when Ron Atkinson's Aston Villa inflicted another defeat on them at Villa Park. United were now 10th in the league, eight points behind leaders Arsenal, and also behind unfashionable sides including Norwich City, Coventry City and Ipswich Town, who had been widely tipped as sides more likely to be battling against relegation rather than challenging for the title.

Ferguson realised that something had to be done if United were to remain in the title race. He made a £3 million bid for Sheffield Wednesday striker David Hirst, but the bid was rejected. He then received an offer from defending champions Leeds United (along with fellow pre-season title favourites Liverpool, now in the bottom half of the table) for defender Denis Irwin, but rejected the offer. However, he did ask manager Howard Wilkinson if he was willing to part company with 26-year-old French striker Eric Cantona. On 26 November, Cantona signed for United in a £1.2 million deal, and slotted into the United attack alongside Mark Hughes, with Brian McClair being drafted into central midfield alongside Paul Ince.

By the time Cantona arrived, United had returned to their winning ways with a 3–0 home win over strugglers Oldham Athletic, in which 17-year-old midfielder Nicky Butt made his debut as a substitute. The winning form continued a week later when a Mark Hughes goal gave United a 1–0 win at Highbury over an Arsenal side who were now struggling to score goals and looking less likely to win the league title than they had a few weeks earlier.

A week after the win at Highbury, the Manchester derby at Old Trafford ended in a 2–1 win for United in a game where Eric Cantona made his debut. His first goal for the club came on 19 December in a 1–1 draw against Chelsea at Stamford Bridge. By now, United were on an upswing in the league and narrowing the gap between themselves and the top of the table.

Arguably the most exciting league game of the season was against Sheffield Wednesday at Hillsborough on Boxing Day, when United fought back to draw 3–3 (after being 3–0 down at half time) with Brian McClair scoring twice and Eric Cantona once. They had now climbed up to third place in the table, five points behind leaders Norwich City and two points behind second placed Blackburn Rovers. Arsenal's title challenge was now looking dead as they had slid down to eighth and failed to halt the shortage of goals, while Liverpool and Leeds United remained in the bottom half of the table – and almost certainly now out of the picture as far as the title race was concerned.

The resurgence continued into the new year and United's unbeaten run ended at the end of that month as they lost 2–1 to an Ipswich Town side who were emerging as surprise title contenders and now stood fourth, while United stood second when a draw would have been enough to put them ahead of Ipswich's East Anglian rivals Norwich City. January had also seen United dispose of Bury and then Brighton & Hove Albion in the FA Cup, although the league title remained the number one priority.

However, the FA Cup quest ended on 14 February when Steve Bruce missed a penalty as United 2–1 at Sheffield United in the FA Cup fifth round, ending their double hopes, though it freed them up to concentrate on the league. They finally went top on 6 March with a 2–1 win at Anfield over a Liverpool side who were now 15th in the table and just three points above the relegation zone, though this result was arguably the catalyst for United's fierce north western rivals who then turned their season around to climb to sixth place in the final table.

However, a four match winless run (a defeat and three draws) then dragged United down to third place as Norwich City and Aston Villa gained a slim lead over them by the end of March. United then dealt a major blow to Norwich's title hopes on 5 April with a 3–1 win over them at Carrow Road, before two injury time goals from Steve Bruce inspired a 2–1 win over Sheffield Wednesday at Old Trafford five days later to return United to the top of the table. United's final six games all ended in victory, with Aston Villa's surprise 1–0 home defeat to Oldham Athletic on 2 May meant that United were now out of reach at the top of the league and the 26-year wait was over.

The next day, they proved themselves as worthy champions with a 3–1 home win over fourth placed Blackburn Rovers, whose title challenge had faded away after Alan Shearer was ruled out for the second half of the season with a knee injury.

The campaign ended at Selhurst Park on 9 May when United won 2–1 against Wimbledon, in a game where Bryan Robson scored his first goal in 18 months. Robson, now 36, was now United's longest serving player with 12 years of unbroken service (though Mark Hughes had begun his career at Old Trafford a year earlier he did have two seasons away from the club at FC Barcelona and then Bayern Munich) but his days were looking numbered as it became clear that a younger central midfield partner was needed for Paul Ince. By the end of May, a name strongly linked to United was the 21-year-old Nottingham Forest and Republic of Ireland midfielder Roy Keane, and he even stated that Old Trafford was his preferred destination. However, Alex Ferguson faced competition from Arsenal and Blackburn Rovers for Keane's signature. The deal was finally done on 22 July, when Keane completed his move to United for an English record fee of £3.75 million.

United were now clearly established as England's leading club side, but were not willing to rest on their laurels, and nor were their rivals. Leeds United and Liverpool both spent heavily in the transfer market that summer in hope of improving upon their disappointing showings the previous season, while Newcastle United wasted no time in preparing for their top flight comeback under the management of Kevin Keegan after a four-year exile. There was relatively little action in the transfer market from the four sides who finished below United, though.

References

Manchester United F.C. seasons
Manchester United
1993